Edward Harley (1839 – 9 June 1901) was an English cricketer. He played in three first-class matches in New Zealand for Canterbury from 1864 to 1869.

See also
 List of Canterbury representative cricketers

References

External links
 

1839 births
1901 deaths
English cricketers
Canterbury cricketers
Cricketers from Leicester